= Finnish 5th Division =

Finnish 5th Division may refer to:

- Finnish 5th Division (Continuation War)
- Finnish 5th Division (Winter War)
